The men's individual hand fronton basque pelota event at the 2019 Pan American Games was held from 4–10 August at the Basque pelota courts in the Villa María del Triunfo Sports Center in Lima, Peru. The David Alvarez won the gold medal, after defeating Dariel Leiva Nelson in the final.

Results

Preliminary round
The preliminary stage consisted of 2 pools where every competitor played each other competitor in the same pool once. At the end of this stage, the first two teams from each pool played in the semifinals, and then the medal round.

Pool A

All times are local (UTC-5)

Pool B

All times are local (UTC-5)

Semifinals

Bronze medal match

Gold medal match

References

Men's individual hand fronton